The LTP Charleston Pro Tennis is a series of tennis tournaments held on outdoor clay courts at LTP Tennis in Charleston, South Carolina, United States. It has been held since 2015 and is part of the WTA Challenger Tour and the ITF Women's Circuit as WTA 125 and $100k events.

Past finals

Singles

Doubles

External links 
 

WTA 125 tournaments
ITF Women's World Tennis Tour
Clay court tennis tournaments
Tennis tournaments in the United States
Tennis tournaments in South Carolina
Sports in Charleston, South Carolina
Recurring sporting events established in 2015
2015 establishments in South Carolina
 
Sports competitions in South Carolina
Events in Charleston, South Carolina